Reunion 3: Singles Cruise (also known as Class Reunion 3) is a 2021 Finnish comedy film directed by Renny Harlin. It is third entry of the Reunion film series, and the only film in the film series that Taneli Mustonen, who directed the previous films, was not involved in making. In the film, friends Tuomas and Niklas take their mutual friend Antti, who suffers from unemployment and loneliness, on a single cruise to improve his self-esteem and mental health, with bad consequences. Like the previous film, the sequel is starring by Sami Hedberg, Aku Hirviniemi and Jaajo Linnonmaa.

The invitation-only guest premiere of the film was held at Bio Vuoksi in Imatra on July 23, 2021, to where it had been moved due to the COVID-19 restrictions in the Helsinki metropolitan area. The film came to a wider theatrical distribution on July 28th. Like its predecessors, the film has received a negative reception from critics, with Helsingin Sanomat, Demokraatti, Hämeen Sanomat, Turun Sanomat, and Katso giving the film one star out of five.

The title song of the film "Hauskaa" is performed by the band Osmo’s Cosmos from Imatra.

Cast 
 Sami Hedberg as Antti
 Aku Hirviniemi as Niklas
 Jaajo Linnonmaa as Tuomas
 Pertti Sveholm  as Akseli
 Pihla Maalismaa as Pilve
 Antti Luusuaniemi as Karno
 Ilona Chevakova as Hanne
 Kuura Rossi as Ville
 Niina Lahtinen as Jaana
 Annikki Hirviniemi as Saara
 Johanna Puhakka as Leila
 Mari Perankoski as female pig
 Jukka Puotila as Lennart
 Eino Heiskanen as Peter

References

External links 

 Luokkakokous 3 – sinkkuristeily at Nordisk Film (in Finnish)

2021 comedy films
2021 films
Finnish comedy films
Films directed by Renny Harlin
Finnish sequel films